Helenna Louise Hercigonja-Moulton (born 28 April 1993) is an American-born Croatian footballer who plays as a defender who plays for ŽNK Pomurje. She also plays for the Croatia women's national football team.

Her mother is Croatian and her father was born in Jamaica.

References

External links
 
 Player Slovenian domestic stats at NZS 
 

1993 births
Living people
Women's association football defenders
Croatian women's footballers
Croatia women's international footballers
Croatian people of Jamaican descent
Medyk Konin players
Croatian expatriate women's footballers
Croatian expatriate sportspeople in Poland
Expatriate women's footballers in Poland
Croatian expatriate sportspeople in Slovenia
Expatriate women's footballers in Slovenia
Croatian women's futsal players
University of Zagreb alumni
American women's soccer players
American emigrants to Croatia
American women's futsal players
ŽNK Mura players